The Charité – Universitätsmedizin Berlin (Charité – Berlin University of Medicine) is one of Europe's largest university hospitals, affiliated with Humboldt University and Free University Berlin. With numerous Collaborative Research Centres of the German Research Foundation it is one of Germany's most research-intensive medical institutions. From 2012 to 2022, it was ranked by Focus as the best of over 1000 hospitals in Germany. In 2019 to 2022 Newsweek ranked the Charité as the 5th best hospital in the world, and the best in Europe. More than half of all German Nobel Prize winners in Physiology or Medicine, including Emil von Behring, Robert Koch and Paul Ehrlich, have worked at the Charité. Several politicians and diplomats have been treated at the Charité, including German Chancellor Angela Merkel, who underwent meniscus treatment at the Orthopaedic Department, Yulia Tymoshenko from Ukraine, and more recently Russian opposition leader Alexei Navalny, who received treatment at the hospital due to his poisoning in August 2020.

In 2010–11 the medical schools of Humboldt University and Freie Universität Berlin were united under the roof of the Charité. The admission rate of the reorganized medical school was 3.9% for the 2019–2020 academic year. QS World University Rankings 2019 ranked the Charité Medical School as number one for medicine in Germany and ninth best in Europe. It was also considered the best medical school in Germany by Times Higher Education 2021, being the eighth in Europe.

History

Complying with an order of King Frederick I of Prussia from 14 November 1709, the hospital was established north of the Berlin city walls in 1710 in anticipation of an outbreak of the bubonic plague that had already depopulated East Prussia. After the plague spared the city, it came to be used as a charity hospital for the poor. On 9 January 1727, King Frederick William I of Prussia gave it the name "Charité", French for "charity".

The construction of an anatomical theatre in 1713 marks the beginning of the medical school, then supervised by the collegium medico-chirurgicum of the Prussian Academy of Sciences.

In the 19th century, after the University of Berlin (today Humboldt University) was founded in 1810, the dean of the medical college Christoph Wilhelm Hufeland integrated the Charité as a teaching hospital in 1828. During this time it became home to such notable medical pioneers as Rudolf Virchow, known as "the father of modern pathology" and whose name is given to the eponymous "Virchow's Method" of autopsy; the Swiss psychiatrist and neurologist Otto Binswanger, whose work in vascular dementia led to the discovery of Binswanger's Disease—so coined by his colleague Alois Alzheimer; Robert Koch, who identified the specific causative agents of tuberculosis, cholera, and anthrax; and Emil von Behring, widely known as a "saviour of children" for his 1894 discovery of a diphtheria antitoxin at a time when diphtheria was a major cause of child death (among many others).

In the 20th century, at the end of the Second World War, the Charité had endured the Battle of Berlin, with Berlin having been taken by the Red Army on 2 May 1945. Though the majority of its original and pre-War structure was damaged or destroyed during the War, it nevertheless was used as a Red Army hospital. Subsequent to Victory in Europe, in the period of denazification and the Nuremberg trials, the Charité remained in the Soviet Sector of Berlin until the formation of the German Democratic Republic, the GDR—(German: Deutsche Demokratische Republik, DDR)—in 1949, more commonly called East Germany. Under the Communists, standards were largely maintained, and it became a showpiece for East Bloc propaganda during the Cold War. Corpses of Berlin Wall victims were taken here for autopsies.

In 1990, with the reunification of Germany, and in the years following, Charité once again became one of the world's leading research and teaching hospitals.

Organization

The Charité has four different campuses across the city of Berlin with a total of 3,001 beds:
 Campus in Mitte, Berlin 
 Campus Benjamin Franklin (CBF) in Lichterfelde, Berlin 
 Campus Virchow Klinikum (CVK) in Wedding, Berlin 
 Campus Berlin Buch (CBB) in Buch, Berlin 

In 2001, the Helios Clinics Group acquired the hospitals in Buch with their 1,200 beds. Still, the Charité continues to use the campus for teaching and research and has more than 300 staff members located there.
The Charité encompasses more than 100 clinics and scientific institutes, organized in 17 different departments, referred to as Charité Centers (CC):

 CC 1: Health and Human Sciences
 CC 2: Basic Sciences (First Year)
 CC 3: Dental, Oral and Maxillary Medicine
 CC 4: Charité-BIH Center for Therapy Research
 CC 5: Diagnostic Laboratory and Preventative Medicine
 CC 6: Diagnostic and Interventional Radiology and Nuclear Medicine
 CC 7: Anesthesiology, Operating-Room Management and Intensive Care Medicine
 CC 8: Surgery
 CC 9: Traumatology and Reconstructive Medicine
 CC 10: Charité Comprehensive Cancer Center
 CC 11: Cardiovascular Diseases
 CC 12: Internal Medicine and Dermatology
 CC 13: Internal Medicine, Gastroenterology and Nephrology
 CC 14: Tumor Medicine
 CC 15: Neurology, Neurosurgery, Psychiatry
 CC 16: Audiology/Phoniatrics, Ophthalmology and Otolaryngology
 CC 17: Gynecology, Perinatal, Pediatric and Adolescent Medicine with Perinatal Center & Human Genetics
Overall, 13 of those centers focus on patient care, while the rest focuses on research and teaching.
The Medical History Museum Berlin has a history dating back to 1899. The museum in its current form opened in 1998 and is famous for its pathological and anatomical collection.

Notable people

Many famous physicians and scientists worked or studied at the Charité. Indeed, more than half of the German Nobel Prize winners in medicine and physiology come from the Charité. Fifty seven Nobel laureates are affiliated with Humboldt University of Berlin and five with Freie Universität Berlin.

 Selmar Aschheim (1878-1965) – gynecologist
 Heinrich Adolf von Bardeleben (1819-1895) – surgeon
 Ernst von Bergmann (1836-1907)- surgeon
 August Bier (1861-1949) – surgeon
 Max Bielschowsky (1869-1940) – neuropathologist
 Theodor Billroth (1829-1894) – surgeon
 Otto Binswanger (1852-1929) - psychiatrist and neurologist
 Karl Bonhoeffer (1868-1948) - neurologist
 Hans Gerhard Creutzfeldt (1885-1964) – neurologist and neuropathologist
 Johann Friedrich Dieffenbach (1792-1847) – surgeon
 Christian Drosten – virologist
 Friedrich Theodor von Frerichs – pathologist
 Robert Froriep – anatomist
 Wilhelm Griesinger – psychiatrist and neurologist
 Hermann von Helmholtz – physician and physicist
 Joachim Friedrich Henckel – surgeon
 Friedrich Gustav Jakob Henle – physician, pathologist and anatomist
 Eduard Heinrich Henoch – pediatrician
 Otto Heubner – pediatrician
 Rahel Hirsch – first female medical professor in Prussia
 Erich Hoffmann – dermatologist
 Anton Ludwig Ernst Horn – psychiatrist
 Gero Hütter – hematologist
 Friedrich Jolly – neurologist and psychiatrist
 Friedrich Kraus – internist
 Bernhard von Langenbeck – surgeon
 Karl Leonhard – psychiatrist
 Hugo Karl Liepmann – neurologist and psychiatrist
 Leonor Michaelis – biochemist and physician
 Hermann Oppenheim – neurologist
 Samuel Mitja Rapoport – biochemist and physician
 Moritz Heinrich Romberg – neurologist
 Ferdinand Sauerbruch – surgeon
 Curt Schimmelbusch – physician and pathologist
 Johann Lukas Schönlein – physician and pathologist
 Theodor Schwann – zoologist
 Ludwig Traube – physician and pathologist
 Rudolf Virchow – physician, founder of cell theory and modern pathology
 Karl Friedrich Otto Westphal – neurologist and psychiatrist
 Carl Wernicke – neurologist
 August von Wassermann – bacteriologist
 Caspar Friedrich Wolff – physiologist
 Bernhard Zondek – endocrinologist

Nobel laureates
 Emil Adolf von Behring – physiologist (Nobel Prize in Physiology or Medicine in 1901)
 Ernst Boris Chain – biochemist (Nobel Prize in Physiology or Medicine in 1945)
 Paul Ehrlich – immunologist (Nobel Prize in Physiology or Medicine in 1908)
 Hermann Emil Fischer – chemist (Nobel Prize in Chemistry in 1902)
 Werner Forssmann – physician (Nobel Prize in Physiology or Medicine in 1956)
 Robert Koch – physician (Nobel Prize in Physiology or Medicine in 1905)
 Albrecht Kossel (1853-1927) – physician (Nobel Prize in Physiology or Medicine in 1910)
 Sir Hans Adolf Krebs (1900-1981) – physician and biochemist (Nobel Prize in Physiology or Medicine in 1953)
 Fritz Albert Lipmann (1899-1986) – biochemist (Nobel Prize in Physiology or Medicine in 1953)
 Hans Spemann (1869-1941) – embryologist (Nobel Prize in Physiology or Medicine in 1935)
 Otto Heinrich Warburg (1883-1970) – physiologist (Nobel Prize in Physiology or Medicine in 1931)

Medical school

In 2003 the Berlin city and state House of Representatives passed an interim law unifying the medical faculties of both Humboldt University and Freie Universität Berlin under the roof of the Charité. Since 2010–11 all new medical students have been enrolled on the New Revised Medical Curriculum Programme with a length of 6 years. Referred to the points needed in the German Abitur to get directly accepted, the Charité is together with Heidelberg University Medical School Germany's most competitive medical school (2020). 3,17% of all Charité Medical School students are supported by the German Academic Scholarship Foundation, the highest percentage of all public German universities. The Erasmus Exchange Programme offered to Charité Medical School students includes 72 universities and is the largest in Europe. Charité students can spend up to a year at a foreign medical school with exchange partners such as the Karolinska Institute, University of Copenhagen, Sorbonne University, Jagiellonian University, Università di Roma La Sapienza, University of Amsterdam, and the University of Zürich. Students are also encouraged to participate in research projects, complete a dissertation, or join Charité affiliated social projects.

In 2021, the Berlin Institute of Health (BIH) became the translational research unit of Charité, marking a change in the German university system by making the Charité the first university clinic which receive direct and annual financial support by the federal state of Germany. Together with private charity donors like the Johanna Quandt's private excellence initiative or the Bill & Melinda Gates Foundation, as well as financing by the State of Berlin, the new direct federal investments will become the third financial fundament for research at the Charité. In addition, it is part of the Berlin University Alliance, receiving funding from the German Universities Excellence Initiative in 2019.

International partner universities 
 UK: Oxford University
 UK: London School of Hygiene and Tropical Medicine 
 US: Johns Hopkins School of Medicine, Baltimore
 US: Northwestern University, Chicago
 Canada: Université de Montréal
 Australia: Monash University, Melbourne
 Japan: Chiba University
 Japan: Saitama Medical School
 Brazil: Universidade de São Paulo
 China: Tongji University, Shanghai
 China: Tongji Medical College, Wuhan

Einstein Foundation
The Charité is one of the main partners of the Einstein Foundation, which was established by the city and state of Berlin in 2009. It is a "foundation that aims to promote science and research of top international caliber in Berlin and to establish the city as a centre of scientific excellence". Research fellows include:
 Thomas Südhof – biochemist (Nobel Prize in Physiology or Medicine in 2013)
 Brian Kobilka – chemist (Nobel Prize in Chemistry in 2012)
 Edvard Moser – neuroscientist (Nobel Prize in Physiology or Medicine in 2014)

Television
 Charité (Season 1, take place in 1888)
 Charité at War, (Season 2, takes place between 1943 and 1945)
 Charité "In the shadow of the wall" (Season 3, takes place in 1961)

See also
 List of university hospitals in  Germany

References

External links

 

 
Universities and colleges in Berlin
1710 establishments in Prussia
Hospitals established in the 1710s
Teaching hospitals in Germany
Medical schools in Germany
Medical and health organisations based in Berlin